Saw Gerrera is a fictional character in the Star Wars franchise. He was originally introduced as a minor character in the animated series Star Wars: The Clone Wars, where he was voiced by Andrew Kishino. He was subsequently played by Forest Whitaker in the film Rogue One: A Star Wars Story, who went on to voice the character in the animated series Star Wars Rebels and the video game Star Wars Jedi: Fallen Order, and reprises the role in live-action in the television series Andor. Saw also appears in The Clone Wars spin-off Star Wars: The Bad Batch, with Kishino reprising his role.

In The Clone Wars, he is the brother of the leader of the Onderon rebels, Steela Gerrera, with whom he helps free Onderon from the Confederacy of Independent Systems, and is mentored in military combat by Obi-Wan Kenobi, Anakin Skywalker, and Padawan Ahsoka Tano, as well as clone trooper Captain Rex. In Rogue One, Saw is the foster parent and mentor in military combat of Jyn Erso, as well as the leader of the Partisans, an anarchist rebel cell unaffiliated with the Rebel Alliance due to Saw's violent military tactics, whose missions are explored in some episodes of Rebels and other Star Wars media.

Concept and creation
Though Saw appeared in animated form in The Clone Wars, that was not the original plan for him. Appearing on The Star Wars Show, Pablo Hidalgo of Lucasfilm's Story Group revealed the character’s origin; "He started off before that. George Lucas had him in mind for his live-action TV series that was in development, which ultimately never happened, but he found a place to put Saw into a story in Clone Wars."

Supervising director of The Clone Wars Dave Filoni stated: "We wanted a brother/sister duo on Onderon, and the character Saw was a character that George had already created, and he just wanted to involve and tell a little more about that character. So in the course of that we created Steela [to be Saw's sister], who would act as a natural foil to Ahsoka."

Andrew Kishino, who voiced Saw in The Clone Wars, said that the character "Has even sort of, embodied in him, that feisty spirit of the Rebellion. The take-no-garbage kind of individual. He's stoic and strong and brash. He's 'that' guy, and it's that kind of strength tempered with Steela's calm, level-headed thinking, that is, to stand up to something that will ultimately become the Empire, absolutely critical and necessary.

Saw Gerrera's name is a "mnemonic riff" on the Argentinian revolutionary Che Guevara. Gerrera is also a heterograph of the Spanish word "guerrera", meaning "female warrior", describing Steela.

Entertainment Weekly revealed the character's appearance in Rogue One on June 22, 2016. The film's director, Gareth Edwards, had wanted a character to showcase the more "militant" and "extreme" side of the rebellion. Co-producer Kiri Hart suggested using Gerrera, a pre-established character, in this role. Gerrera appears significantly older in Rogue One than he did in The Clone Wars, despite the two works taking place only roughly twenty years apart.

Appearances

Films and television

Star Wars: The Clone Wars

Saw Gerrera (voiced by Andrew Kishino) first appeared in the fifth season of Star Wars: The Clone Wars, in the "Onderon arc" consisting of the episodes "A War on Two Fronts", "Front Runners", "The Soft War", and "Tipping Points". The character appears on all the episodes of the arc, along with his sister, Steela Gerrera, the leader of the Onderon rebels. The Jedi Knights Obi-Wan Kenobi and Anakin Skywalker (and his Padawan Ahsoka Tano), along with clone trooper Captain Rex, secretly train Saw and the other members of the resistance movement in military combat but refuse to get involved in the conflict, and leave Ahsoka to supervise the operation with instructions to not fight the battle for them.

Saw attempts to rescue the deposed King Ramsis Dendup from execution, only to be captured and tortured. However, he plays a vital part in the Onderon rebellion by convincing Dendup and militia General Tandin that the rebels are fighting out of loyalty to their rightful sovereign. Eventually, Saw and Steela lead the Onderon resistance to victory over the Confederacy of Independent Systems, though not without paying a heavy price for it when Steela dies saving the king. Dave Filoni, along with the writers, decided for the arc to end with the death of Steela, because in his words, he wanted to depict that "there had to be a price paid for their freedom".

Star Wars Rebels

Saw is mentioned in the Star Wars Rebels second-season episode "The Honorable Ones", as being a factor in Agent Kallus's disdain for the rebellion's tactics against the Empire and part of the reason he participated in the genocide of the Lasat race of Ghost crew member Garazeb "Zeb" Orrelios.

Saw makes an appearance in the third season, two-part episode "Ghosts of Geonosis", with Forest Whitaker reprising his role from Rogue One in vocal capacity. Given the continuity error of Saw having a different eye colour in Rogue One to his appearance in The Clone Wars, a mixture of the two was used to imply Gerrera's eye colour to be changing with age.

In the episode, the Rebellion loses contact with Saw and his squad investigating Geonosis and decide to send the Ghost crew to rescue him. Saw saves Jedi Knight Kanan Jarrus, his Padawan Ezra Bridger, and Captain Rex from a group of battle droids. He tells them of an operational shield generator that he found, leading him to deduce that a Geonosian is still alive. Saw convinces them that they need to find the Geonosian, as it could tell them why the Empire virtually exterminated its species. They discover the Geonosian, whom Ezra names "Klik-Klak". Saw aggressively interrogates Klik-Klak and forces him to lead them to the source of an energy reading, handcuffing him as well. They reach his home, which Gerrera ransacks, suspecting him to be hiding something. The Rebels learn that Klik-Klak has been protecting an egg of his race, and take him to the Ghost for questioning. Saw resorts to torturing him with electric shock and even threatening to destroy the egg. However, upon finding more evidence of the genocide of the Geonosians by the Empire, Saw has a change of heart and lets Klik-Klak back to his lair, giving him a chance to rebuild the Geonosian population.

Saw reappears in the fourth season's two-part episode "In the Name of the Rebellion", which is set shortly before the events of Rogue One. He gives information on a new Imperial relay station to the Rebel Alliance, and condemns their unwillingness to do whatever it takes to win, blaming it as the reason for their losses. He later rescues Ezra and Sabine Wren during their mission to assist him in learning about the Empire's super weapon, which he was investigating since his mission to Geonosis. They board an Imperial freighter, where they find a giant Kyber Crystal which the Empire is shipping. Ezra and Sabine try to pull the ship out of hyperspace out of concern for the prisoners aboard, but Saw, desperate to find out about the Empire's plans, stuns them. Though learning the weapon is powered by Kyber Crystals, Saw reaches a dead end. To prevent the Empire from obtaining the crystal, he causes it to begin absorbing energy until it explodes. Before fleeing, Saw offers Ezra a chance to join him. Ezra chooses to stay with the Alliance.

Rogue One: A Star Wars Story

Saw reappears in Rogue One: A Star Wars Story, portrayed by Forest Whitaker. Within the film, Gerrera leads the Partisans, an extremist rebel faction unaffiliated with the Rebel Alliance, on the planet Jedha. He plays on the frequent theme of duality between light and dark, a Rebel foil of Darth Vader whose body is mostly mechanized and who uses extreme methods in the pursuit of his goals. 

He is Jyn Erso's mentor, having rescued and adopted her as a child when her father Galen was abducted by Orson Krennic, the Imperial military director of weapons research. In the present time, defecting Imperial pilot Bodhi Rook travels to Jedha to deliver a holographic message from Galen to Saw. Believing it to be a deception, Gerrera tortures him with Bor Gullet, a mind-reading, octopus-like creature, and holds Rook captive. Gerrera has a reunion with Jyn on Jedha, where it is revealed he abandoned her years earlier as it was dangerous for him to keep her around, though he later regrets it. He passes along Galen's message and watches it with Jyn, learning about a weakness in the Death Star. Meanwhile, the Death Star fires on Jedha City; while Jyn and her rebel companions escape, Gerrera chooses to stay and is killed when his hideout is annihilated in the wake of the blast. Krennic later boasts to Galen that Gerrera and his band of fanatics are dead.

Star Wars: The Bad Batch 

Saw appears in The Clone Wars spin-off Star Wars: The Bad Batch premiere episode, with Andrew Kishino returning to voice the character. He is shown leading a band of Onderon refugees from the Empire when the Bad Batch is dispatched to eliminate them as "insurgents" by Admiral Tarkin to test their loyalties. After realizing the truth behind this mission, the Bad Batch let Gerrera and his people leave peacefully.

Andor 

Whitaker reprised his role as Saw in the Rogue One spin-off prequel series Andor, which takes place five years before the events of Rogue One.

Novels
Saw appears in the novelization of the film Rogue One by Alexander Freed. Saw Gerrera appears along a seven-year-old Jyn Erso, in the novelization of the film Solo: A Star Wars Story, the short appearance reveals that Enfys Nest was working stealing the fuel for Saw.

Star Wars: Bloodline
The character is mentioned in the novel Star Wars: Bloodline, set six years before the events of Star Wars: The Force Awakens, where it is noted that his methods of combating the Empire are viewed as having been "extreme".

Catalyst: A Rogue One Novel

Gerrera appears in Catalyst: A Rogue One Novel, detailing how he came to meet Galen, Lyra and Jyn Erso.

Rebel Rising
Gerrera appears in the novel Rebel Rising by Beth Revis. The novel's timeline takes place between Catalyst: A Rogue One Novel and the beginning of Rogue One.

Video games

Star Wars Jedi: Fallen Order

Gerrera appears in Star Wars Jedi: Fallen Order, again voiced by Forest Whitaker. Despite the game taking place only five years after The Clone Wars and The Bad Batch, Gerrera appears significantly older, closely resembling his Star Wars Rebels self. He is first seen on Kashyyyk alongside his Partisans attempting to liberate the Wookiees from Imperial occupation. During his quest to find the Wookiee chieftain Tarfull, Cal Kestis encounters Gerrera and his men, who ask for his help in freeing the Wookiees in exchange for tracking down Tarfull. Gerrera's men eventually find Tarfull, but are overwhelmed by Imperial forces and retreat. By the time Cal returns to Kashyyyk to meet with Tarfull, Gerrera has left the planet, though some of his Partisans stayed behind to continue assisting the Wookiees.

References

External links
 
 
 Saw Gerrera on IMDb

Characters created by George Lucas
Star Wars Anthology characters
Star Wars: The Clone Wars characters
Star Wars Rebels characters
Star Wars: The Bad Batch characters
Andor (TV series) characters
Star Wars comics characters
Star Wars video game characters
Black characters in films
Fictional amputees
Fictional characters with respiratory diseases
Fictional cyborgs
Fictional mass murderers
Fictional outlaws
Fictional revolutionaries
Fictional terrorists
Fictional torturers and interrogators
Fictional war veterans
Male characters in animated series
Male characters in film
Fictional soldiers
Television characters introduced in 2012